Teenage Mutant Ninja Turtles III: Radical Rescue, released as Teenage Mutant Hero Turtles III: Radical Rescue in Europe, and  in Japan, is a Game Boy game by Konami, released in November 1993. It is the third Game Boy game based on the Teenage Mutant Ninja Turtles, following Teenage Mutant Ninja Turtles: Fall of the Foot Clan and Teenage Mutant Ninja Turtles II: Back from the Sewers. The game was re-released as part of Teenage Mutant Ninja Turtles: The Cowabunga Collection in 2022.

Gameplay
The player begins the game by taking control of Michaelangelo, who must rescue the other turtles, along with Splinter and April O'Neil, who have been kidnapped by Shredder. Unlike other games based on the franchise, this is a scrolling action-adventure game reminiscent of Metroid, Konami's own The Goonies II and the later Castlevania: Symphony of the Night. Each turtle has a different ability which is necessary to finish the game. Michaelangelo can hover using his nunchakus as a helicopter, Leonardo can drill the floor by spinning with his katana, Raphael can hide himself inside his shell to enter passages that are otherwise too small to enter, and Donatello can stick to and climb walls.

The bosses are Scratch, Dirtbag, a Triceraton, Scale Tale, and Shredder (in this game known as Cyber-Shredder).

Reception

Notes

References

External links
 

1993 video games
Konami games
Platform games
Side-scrolling video games
Radical Rescue
Game Boy games
Metroidvania games
Video game sequels
Video games set in the United States
Video games developed in Japan